Thel or THEL may refer to any of the following:

 Thel, main character of The Book of Thel, by William Blake
 Thel (opera), by Dmitri N. Smirnov, based on Blake's work
 THEL, acronym for the Tactical High Energy Laser
 Thel, Rhône, a former commune in the Rhône department in eastern France
 Thel Vadam, the name of the current Arbiter from the Halo Series.